Boxing at the 2019 Pacific Games in Apia, Samoa was held on 15–19 July 2019.

Participating nations

Medal table

Medalists

Men

Women

References
 Boxing at the Pacific Games

References

2019
2019 Pacific Games
Pacific Games